KDBX is a radio station whose transmitter is located in the nearby town of Clear Lake, South Dakota, but the studios are in Brookings. The station carries The Bob & Tom Show in the mornings, and is an affiliate of the syndicated Floydian Slip Pink Floyd show. KDBX broadcasts across a wide region encompassing both the Brookings and Watertown areas in eastern South Dakota as well as reaching points in western Minnesota as far as Marshall and Benson. The station was formerly in a historic train depot. In 2005, the depot was sold and KDBX relocated to the building now housing the other four commercial radio stations in Brookings.

Format
KDBX is a classic rock station playing a mix of rock music from the '60s through the '80s. The station changed to this format in the summer of 2005, switching from an alternative music format.

Previous logo
  (KDBX's logo under previous classic hits format)

External links
107.1 The Hawk website

DBX
Classic rock radio stations in the United States
Radio stations established in 1999
Alpha Media radio stations
1999 establishments in South Dakota